The 2010 congressional elections in Pennsylvania were held on November 2, 2010. Pennsylvania had nineteen seats in the United States House of Representatives. The election was held on the same day as many other PA elections, and the same day as House of Representatives elections in other states. Party primary elections were held May 18, 2010.

Overview

By district
Results of the 2010 United States House of Representatives elections in Pennsylvania by district:

Congressional districts

District 1

Democratic incumbent Bob Brady was the only member of the Pennsylvania delegation who ran unopposed in 2010.

Brady, a long time central figure in the Pennsylvania Democratic Party, has never received less than 74% in a general election, and opponents have had difficult recruiting even moderately electable candidates in this majority-minority district that includes South Philadelphia and some working class suburbs in Delaware County. No Republican has represented this district since 1949. In 2008, he earned 91% of the vote against Mike Muhammad, a teacher who raised no outside funds. Respected for his ability to reach political deals behind the scenes, Brady has garnered an image as an effective politician, and thus has been rarely challenged by other Democrats. In 2010, Pia Varma, a young freelance writer for conservative publications attempted to gain the Republican nomination, but failed to produce enough signatures to appear on the ballot.
PA - District 1 from OurCampaigns.com
Race ranking and details from CQ Politics
Campaign contributions from OpenSecrets

District 2

Democratic incumbent Chaka Fattah ran for reelection. He faced Republican Rick Hellberg, the CEO of a small financial firm. In 2008, Obama carried this district with 90% of the vote.

Fattah represents one of the top five most Democratic districts in the country, and has never received less than 79% of the vote in his over fifteen year House career. The district includes North Philadelphia and several traditionally liberal suburbs in Montgomery County. Fattah has had the consistent support of the African American community that is the base of a district that hasn't swung Republican since the 1946 elections. Despite this huge Democratic advantage, the district has small pockets of solid Republican territory, and thus Fattah has continuously received GOP opponents (although ones who were unable to raise all more than a few thousand dollars in fundraising), unlike his counterpart in the 1st District. In 2008, Fattah defeated engineer Adam Lang with 81% of the vote.

Fattah won the 2010 general election with 89.3% of the vote.

PA - District 2 from OurCampaigns.com
Race ranking and details from CQ Politics
Campaign contributions from OpenSecrets

District 3

Democratic incumbent Kathy Dahlkemper unsuccessfully ran for re-election, losing to Republican businessman Mike Kelly, who received 55.7% of the vote. In 2008, McCain carried this district with 49% of the vote.

Dahlkemper faced a difficult reelection bid, in a race that considered a tossup by most political analysts. Dahlkemper became used to tight campaigns in her short political career. A political unknown prior to her 2008 campaign, Dahlkemper leveraged a moderate, blue collar image that enticed Democratic voters in a district this is generally pro-union, with a center-right tilt on social issues. Dahlkemper, the owner of a large landscaping business and manager of an Erie County arboretum, came from behind to defeat Erie County Concilman Kyle Foust, the endorsed Democratic candidate. She then went on to narrowly unseat (with 52% of the vote) Congressman Phil English, a moderate Republican who had maintained good relations with labor, by attacking his ties to the Bush administration and for failing to follow through on a promise to retire after six terms. During her first term, Dahlkemper has served as a member of the Blue Dog Coalition of conservative Democrats, which has allowed her to keep a middle ground image. However, her vote in favor of healthcare legislation and the lack of an entrenched image in certain corners of the district left her vulnerable.

In 2010, Dahlkemper faced a primary challenge from former foreign affairs official Mel Marin, winning with 73% of the vote. Republicans focused heavily on regaining the seat, and six GOP candidates earned spots on the ballot: automobile dealer Mike Kelly, manufacturing executive Paul Huber, pharmaceutical representative Clayton Grabb, physician Steve Fisher, factory foreman Ed Franz, and accountant Martha Moore. Kelly and Huber far outraised the remaining four challengers, and they became entangled in an expensive campaign. Kelly was eventually victorious, winning 28% of the vote to Huber's 27% in the factious affair.

Kelly, a former member of the Butler City Council, had a base of support in the heavily Republican Butler County, while Dahlkemper was well known in Erie, the center of population for the district. Other small cities in the district, such as Sharon and Meadville were swing regions, with a slightly conservative tilt that balanced out strongly Democratic Erie. John McCain carried the 3rd District by a 49%-48% margin, which reflects the political balance of the area.
PA - District 3 from OurCampaigns.com
Race ranking and details from CQ Politics
Campaign contributions from OpenSecrets

Polling

District 4

Democratic incumbent Jason Altmire ran for re-election and faced Republican attorney Keith Rothfus. In 2008, McCain carried this district with 55% of the vote.

Altmire narrowly won re-elected with 50.8% of the vote.
PA - District 4 from OurCampaigns.com
Race ranking and details from CQ Politics
Campaign contributions from OpenSecrets

District 5

Republican incumbent Glenn "G.T." Thompson successfully ran for re-election. He defeated Democrat Michael Pipe and Libertarian Vernon Etzel. In 2008, McCain carried this district with 55% of the vote.
PA - District 5 from OurCampaigns.com
Race ranking and details from CQ Politics
Campaign contributions from OpenSecrets

District 6

Republican incumbent Jim Gerlach successfully ran for re-election. He defeated Democrat Iraq War veteran Manan Trivedi. In 2008, Obama carried this district with 58% of the vote.
PA - District 6 from OurCampaigns.com
Race ranking and details from CQ Politics
Campaign contributions from OpenSecrets

District 7

Democratic incumbent Joe Sestak retired to run for the U.S. Senate. Democratic nominee State Representative Bryan Lentz faced Republican nominee U.S. Attorney Pat Meehan and American Constitution Party (independent) nominee Jim Schneller. 
PA - District 7 from OurCampaigns.com
Race ranking and details from CQ Politics
Campaign contributions from OpenSecrets

District 8

Democratic incumbent Patrick Murphy unsuccessfully ran for re-election. He was defeated by Republican former U.S. Congressman Mike Fitzpatrick. In 2008, Obama carried this district with 54% of the vote.
PA - District 8 from OurCampaigns.com
Race ranking and details from CQ Politics
Campaign contributions from OpenSecrets

Polling

District 9

Republican incumbent Bill Shuster successfully ran for re-election. He defeated Democrat Tom Conners and Independent Chad Clopper.
PA - District 9 from OurCampaigns.com
Race ranking and details from CQ Politics
Campaign contributions from OpenSecrets

District 10

Democratic incumbent Chris Carney unsuccessfully ran for re-election, losing to Republican nominee U.S. Attorney Tom Marino. In 2008, McCain carried this district with 54% of the vote.
PA - District 10 from OurCampaigns.com
Race ranking and details from CQ Politics
Campaign contributions from OpenSecrets

District 11

Democratic incumbent Paul E. Kanjorski unsuccessfully ran for re-election, losing to Republican Hazleton Mayor Lou Barletta. In 2008, Obama carried this district with 57% of the vote.

Kanjorski faced Corey O'Brien and Brian Kelly in the May 2010 Democratic primary, and won with 49.3% of the primary vote.
PA - District 11 from OurCampaigns.com
Race ranking and details from CQ Politics
Campaign contributions from OpenSecrets

District 12

Special election

General election

Democrat Mark Critz won a May 2010 special election to replace John Murtha, who served the district for 36 years. He faced Republican businessman Tim Burns. Critz again defeated Burns in the regularly scheduled November general election. In 2008, McCain carried this district with 49% of the vote.
PA - District 12 from OurCampaigns.com
Race ranking and details from CQ Politics
Campaign contributions from OpenSecrets
Pennsylvania 12th District Candidates debate on C-SPAN, May 5, 2010 (1:00:00)

District 13

Democratic incumbent Allyson Schwartz successfully ran for re-election. She defeated Republican Dee Adcock. Obama carried this district with 59% of the vote.
PA - District 13 from OurCampaigns.com
Race ranking and details from CQ Politics
Campaign contributions from OpenSecrets

District 14

Democratic incumbent Mike Doyle successfully ran for re-election. He defeated Republican Melissa Haluszczak and Green Party nominee Ed Bortz. In 2008, Doyle received 91% of the vote and Obama carried this district with 70% of the vote.
PA - District 14 from OurCampaigns.com
Race ranking and details from CQ Politics
Campaign contributions from OpenSecrets

District 15

Republican incumbent Charlie Dent successfully ran for re-election. He defeated Democrat Bethlehem Mayor John B. Callahan and Independent Jake Towne. In 2008, Obama carried this district with 56% of the vote.
PA - District 15 from OurCampaigns.com
Race ranking and details from CQ Politics
Campaign contributions from OpenSecrets

Polling

District 16

Republican incumbent Joe Pitts successfully ran for re-election. He again defeated Democratic nominee Lois Herr. In 2008, McCain carried the district with 51% of the vote.
PA - District 16 from OurCampaigns.com
Race ranking and details from CQ Politics
Campaign contributions from OpenSecrets

District 17

Democratic incumbent Tim Holden successfully ran for re-election. He defeated Republican State Senator Dave Argall. In 2008, McCain carried this district with 51% of the vote.
PA - District 17 from OurCampaigns.com
Race ranking and details from CQ Politics
Campaign contributions from OpenSecrets

District 18

Republican incumbent Tim Murphy successfully ran for re-election. He defeated Democrat Dan Connolly. In 2008, McCain carried this district with 55% of the vote.
PA - District 18 from OurCampaigns.com
Race ranking and details from CQ Politics
Campaign contributions from OpenSecrets

District 19

Republican incumbent Todd Platts successfully ran for re-election. He defeated Democrat Ryan Sanders and Independence Party nominee Joshua Monighan. In 2008, McCain carried this district with 56% of the vote.
PA - District 19 from OurCampaigns.com
Race ranking and details from CQ Politics
Campaign contributions from OpenSecrets

References

External links
Pennsylvania Secretary of State
Official election results
Official general information for voting, no candidate lists
U.S. Congress Candidates for Pennsylvania at Project Vote Smart
Pennsylvania U.S. House from OurCampaigns.com
Campaign contributions for U.S. Congressional races in Pennsylvania from OpenSecrets
2010 Pennsylvania General Election graph of multiple polls from Pollster.com

House - Pennsylvania from the Cook Political Report

Pennsylvania
2010
2010 Pennsylvania elections